Richard Hamilton PC (Ire) (1717) was an officer in the French and the Irish army. In France he fought in the Franco-Dutch War (1672–1678) under Turenne and the War of the Reunions (1683–1684) at the Siege of Luxembourg.

In Ireland he fought for the Jacobites during the Williamite War, rising to the rank of lieutenant-general. He defeated the Protestants of Ulster at the Break of Dromore and the Cladyford in 1689. Later that year he commanded during part of the Siege of Derry. In 1690 he fought valiantly at the Battle of the Boyne, where he was taken prisoner. In April 1692 he was exchanged for Lord Mountjoy. Hamilton died in French exile.

Birth and origins 
Richard was born about 1649, in Ireland, before his family fled to France in 1651 during the Cromwellian Conquest. The place of his birth probably was Nenagh, County Tipperary. He was one of the nine children and the fifth of the six sons of George Hamilton and his wife Mary Butler. His father was Scottish, the fourth son of James Hamilton, 1st Earl of Abercorn, and founder of a cadet branch of the Abercorns. His father would in 1660 be created baronet of Donalong and Nenagh.

His mother was Irish, the third daughter of Thomas Butler, Viscount Thurles, and a sister of the future 1st Duke of Ormond. His mother's family, the Butler dynasty, was Old English and descended from Theobald Walter, who had been appointed Chief Butler of Ireland by King Henry II in 1177. His parents had married in 1629. Richard had eight siblings, who are listed in his father's article.

Both his parents were Catholic, but some relatives on his father's as on his mother's side were Protestants. His grandfather, James Hamilton, 1st Earl of Abercorn, was a Protestant, but his father and all his paternal uncles were raised as Catholics due to the influence of his paternal grandmother, Marion Boyd, a recusant. Some branches of the Hamilton family were Protestant, such as that of his father's second cousin Gustavus (1642–1723), who would become the 1st Viscount Boyne. His mother's family, the Butlers, were generally Catholic with the notable exception of the future 1st Duke of Ormond, his maternal uncle. His eldest brother, James, would turn Protestant when marrying Elizabeth Colepeper in 1661, and his son, also called James Hamilton, would fight on the other side during the Siege of Derry. Richard's younger brother Thomas seems also to have changed religion as he became a captain in the Royal Navy.

Irish wars and first French exile 
His father was a soldier in the Irish army and fought for the royalists under his uncle James Butler, the Earl of Ormond, in the Irish Confederate Wars (1641–1648) and the Cromwellian conquest of Ireland (1649-1653) until early in 1651, when his family followed Ormond into French exile. They first went to Caen where they were accommodated for some time by Elizabeth Preston, the Marchioness of Ormond. From there his mother went to Paris where she lived in the convent of the Feuillantines together with her sister Eleanor, Lady Muskerry, the wife of Donough MacCarty, 2nd Viscount Muskerry, later Earl Clancarty.

Restoration (1660–1667) 
He and his family returned to London in 1660 after the English Restoration. Their Irish estates were returned to them and his father was created Baronet Donalong in 1660 by Charles II. However, the king refused to go further than that because the family was Catholic.

In French service 
Wanting to be a soldier and unable to take the oath of supremacy, obligatory in the English army, Richard followed the example of his elder brothers George and Anthony and went into French service. In 1671 he was commissioned into the regiment that George had raised. This regiment fought for France in the Franco-Dutch war (1672–1678). He must have fought with George under Turenne in the battles of Sinsheim on 16 June 1674, and Entzheim on 6 October. At Entzheim his brothers George and Anthony were wounded. George's and Anthony's wounds and the voyage to England, described below, undertaken by the three brothers, caused them to miss Turenne's winter campaign 1674/1675, during which the French marched south and surprised the Imperialists by launching a surprise attack on Upper Alsace, which culminated in Turennes's victory at the Battle of Turckheim on 5 January 1675.

In March 1675 Richard visited England with his elder brothers George and Anthony. George returned to France from England, but Anthony and Richard continued to Ireland to recruit for the regiment. The recruits were picked up by French ships at Kinsale in April after a missed appointment at Dingle in March.

In 1676 George was killed in a rearguard action at the Col de Saverne.

In 1678 Richard succeeded Thomas Dongan as the regiment's colonel, but the unit was disbanded later that year. He then joined a French regiment that he commanded for over six years. This seems to have been the Roussillon Regiment, according to a remark in a letter from Louvois to d'Avaux.

Either Anthony or Richard played one of six zephyrs in the performance of Quinault's ballet the Triomphe de l'Amour, to music by Lully, on 21 January 1681 at the Château de Saint-Germain-en-Laye before the king.

In the War of the Reunions (1683–1684), Richard commanded the Altmünster sector in the Siege of Luxembourg in 1684 under Maréchal de Créquy.

In Irish service 
Having returned to England, he was made a colonel of a regiment of Irish dragoons by James II on 20 June 1685. He was promoted to brigadier in April 1686, making him the third most senior officer of the Irish Army after Tyrconnell and Justin McCarthy, Viscount Mountcashel. In May 1686 he was appointed to the privy council of Ireland. He went to England with the Irish troops that Richard Talbot, 1st Earl of Tyrconnell, viceroy (Lord Lieutenant) of Ireland, sent to help James when the king's position became precarious in the build-up to the Glorious Revolution and was promoted to major-general on 12 November 1688. These troops should have helped to defend the south coast of England against the imminent Dutch invasion. They caused the Irish Fright in December 1688. They surrendered to the Prince of Orange and were disbanded after James's flight. Richard Hamilton was jailed at the Tower of London.

William, the Prince of Orange, wanted to bring Ireland around to his side by proposing favourable terms to Tyrconnell. He thought to have found a suitable messenger in Richard Hamilton. He freed him from the Tower and sent him to Ireland on parole. Hamilton landed in  Ireland in January 1689 and met Tyrconnell in Dublin. However, instead of trying to convince the viceroy to accept William's offer, Hamilton joined the Jacobites and urged Tyrconnell to reject William's terms. An investigation into his hehaviour later found a witness who had observed Hamilton in a tavern in Ringsend near Dublin just after Hamilton had landed in Ireland. This witness reported that Hamilton had laughed loudly and had boasted how well he had deceived the Prince of Orange.

Tyrconnell promoted him to lieutenant-general and sent him to Ulster at the head of a force of 2500 to put down the Protestant rebellion there. He in effect routed Sir Arthur Rawdon's Protestant Army of the North in the battle called the Break of Dromore on 14 March 1689 in County Down and then continued northwards into County Antrim where he raided Antrim Castle and took Viscount Massereene's silverware and furniture to a value of about £3000, a considerable amount at the time.

He then marched on to Coleraine, which he reached on 27 March. In the meantime James II had landed in Ireland (on 12 March) and had sent Lieutenant-General de Rosen, the French commander-in-chief, up north with an army. The two armies linked up near Strabane on the march to Londonderry. The commanders were both lieutenant-generals, but de Rosen had been appointed Marshal of Ireland for the duration of the campaign. Nevertheless, Hamilton did not want to submit to de Rosen. Lundy, the governor of Londonderry tried to defend the so-called fords along the River Finn south of the city. On 15 April 1689 Richard Hamilton attacked at Clady. The Duke of Berwick was with him. De Rosen broke through the enemy's line of defence in a separate action near Lifford. Lundy fled to the city.

The siege of the town began on 18 April. James and de Rosen returned to Dublin and left Lieutenant-General Jacques de Fontanges, comte de Maumont, in command. However, Maumont was killed during a sally on 21 April and the command devolved to Hamilton, who lacked experience in sieges. De Rosen came back from Dublin to Derry in June. The siege was finally abandoned after 105 days on 31 July 1689. Richard Hamilton retreated with the army southwards.

At the Battle of the Boyne, on 1 July 1690, Hamilton commanded the centre of the Irish army, defending the ford at Oldbridge. He was wounded and taken prisoner. He was interrogated by William who asked him whether his men will continue to fight. Hamilton answered "On my honour, Sir, I believe that they will". Thereupon William twice mutters "Your honour!", reminding him of his broken parole. Hamilton was detained as a prisoner of war for about two years, first in Dublin, then at Chester Castle, and finally at the Tower of London.

Final French exile 
In April 1692 he eventually was freed by being exchanged for Lord Mountjoy. Having arrived in France he went to Versailles to thank Louis XIV for his liberation.

He took service in King James's exile army. In 1692 he served as lieutenant general under Marshal Bellefonds in the forces that assembled at Saint-Vaast-la-Hougue and should have been carried over the Channel by the French Fleet to land on the Isle of Portland and march on London from there. However, that fleet was intercepted by the English and Dutch and was defeated in several actions at Barfleur and La Hougue between the  19 and 24 May 1692, after which the invasion had to be cancelled. In 1696 he became James's master of the robes in addition to lieutenant-general. He lost his employment as soldier when King James's force was dissolved after the Treaty of Ryswick in 1697, in which France recognised William III as the rightful King of England. James II died in 1701 at the Château de Saint-Germain-en-Laye and was succeeded by his son James Francis Edward Stuart, called James III or the Old Pretender. Louis XIV recognised him as James III of England.

In March 1708, during the War of the Spanish Succession (1701–1714), he was involved in an attempt to invade Scotland led by James III. Hamilton was among the about 6000 troops that were assembled at Dunkirk and which comprised six French regiments and the Irish Brigade. These troops were transported by a French fleet commanded by Admiral Claude de Forbin and consisting of 5 men-of-war, two transports and 20 frigates, many of which were Dunkirk privateers. They sailed from Dunkirk up to the Firth of Forth intending to land near Edinburgh, but a stronger British fleet under Admiral George Byng caught up with them. They had to abandon the landing, but Forbin outmaneuvered the British, escaped northwards, and brought the invasion force safely back to Dunkirk by sailing around Scotland and Ireland.

In 1713, Hamilton was implicated in a scandal in which he had plotted to usurp Lord Middleton's position as James's secretary of state. He was chased from James III's court and went to live with his niece Marie-Elisabeth de Gramont, daughter of his sister Elizabeth, Countess de Gramont, at Poussay in the Duchy of Lorraine, at that time still part of the Empire. He died in Poussay in December 1717.

Notes and references

Notes

Citations

Sources 

  – F to L (for Fontanges, comte de Maumont)
  (for his siblings)
 
  
  – (Preview)
 
  – Ab-Adam to Basing
 
  – 1689 to 1691
  – 1692 to 1694
  – 1717
  – England
  – Scotland and Ireland
  – (Snippet view)

  – (for timeline)
 
  
 
  – 1705 to 1714
  – 1689 to 1690
 
 
  
 
 
 
  
  – 1717 to 1718
 
 
 

1650s births
1717 deaths
18th-century Irish military personnel
People from County Tyrone
Irish soldiers in the army of James II of England
Jacobite military personnel of the Williamite War in Ireland
5th Dragoon Guards officers
Irish expatriates in France
Younger sons of baronets